The Pontedera airport  was an airport located in Pontedera, Italy. It was built south-west of the city centre in 1913.

History 
It was built as an airport for airships, by the Royal Italian Navy, just before the beginning of the First World War. Later it became an airport for military planes and used also by Piaggio for testing vehicles. Its importance faded after the Second World War, the hangars were closed and destroyed and the runway was dismantled around the year 2000.

Bibliography

See also 
Galileo Galilei International Airport

References

Airports in Italy
Transport in Tuscany